West Bend Housewares, LLC, based in West Bend, Wisconsin, produces household appliances such as breadmakers, mixers, coffee urns, slow cookers and woks.   The West Bend Company, founded in 1911, was owned by Regal Ware Inc. but was sold to Vernon Hills, Illinois based Focus Products Group which took the name West Bend Housewares.

References

External links 
 West Bend Housewares website
 Bizjournals article
 
 
 
 

Home appliance brands
Home appliance manufacturers
Companies based in Wisconsin
Manufacturing companies based in Wisconsin
Home appliance manufacturers of the United States